Haapavesi TV Mast is a mast in Haapavesi, Finland.

See also
List of tallest structures in Finland

Notes

Towers completed in 1978
Communication towers in Finland
TV Mast
Transmitter sites in Finland
Buildings and structures in North Ostrobothnia
1978 establishments in Finland